The Minister of Defence is the Government of Vietnam member in charge of the Ministry of Defence. The Minister directs the management functions of state for defense, and is responsible for and is the second highest commander of the Vietnam People's Army and Militia. The Minister is also Vice Chairman of the Central Military Commission, a Member of the Politburo and a Member of the Council for National Defense and Security. The current Minister of Defence is Army General Phan Văn Giang, since 8 April 2021.

Chain of command
 General Secretary of the Communist Party
 President
 Prime Minister
 Minister of Defence
 Chief of the General Political Department
 Chief of the General Staff
 Deputy Ministers of Defence

Lists of Ministers of Defence

See also
 Prime Minister of Vietnam 
 Deputy Prime Minister of Vietnam

Notes

References

Bibliography
 

.*
Prime Ministers